The Morning Of is an American pop/indie/rock band originating from Newburgh, New York, United States. The band's first EP, Welcome Change. Goodbye Gravity, held a steady spot in the Top 50 best selling albums on Smartpunk.com for six months. In August 2006, they appeared at Dirt Fest. Their first full length effort, The World as We Know It debuted on the U.S. Billboard heatseekers chart at No. 18 and peaked at the No. 25 pop album on iTunes. They recorded their most recent album, "The Way I Fell In", with producer Jim Wirt (No Doubt, Jacks Mannequin, Incubus, Hoobastank, The Rocket Summer). The album was released on May 11, 2010 and debuted No. 10 on the U.S. Billboard heatseekers chart.

Members
Final lineup
Chris Petrosino - Piano/Guitar/Vocals (2005–2010)
Rob McCurdy - Guitar/Vocals (2005–2010)
Abir Hossain - Bass/Lyricist (2005–2010)
Justin Wiley - Vocals/Guitar (2007–2010)
Jessica Leplon - Vocals (2007–2010)
Dan Celikoyar - Drums/Percussion (2009–2010)
Ryan Jernigan - Bass (2010)

Former Members
Jimmi Kane - Drums (2007–2008)
James Bedore - Vocals (2005–2007)
Rob Curtis - Drums (2005–2007)
Erin McMenemy- Vocals/Keyboards (2006-2007) 
Ashley Widman - Keyboards/Vocals (2005)
Chloe Lewis - Vocals (2009-2010)

Discography
Albums
2005: "Welcome Change. Goodbye Gravity" (self-released)
2006: "The Morning Of" (Japan Release)
2007: Welcome Change, Goodbye Gravity (THR Re-Release)
2007: The Digital EP
2008: The World as We Know It
2010: The Way I Fell In U.S. Heatseekers No. 10

References

External links
Purevolume

Indie rock musical groups from New York (state)
Tragic Hero Records artists